This is a list of cities, towns, and villages in East Timor.

Aileu District
Aileu
Ainaro District
Ainaro
Hato-Udo
Maubara
Baucau District
Baguia
Baucau 14,960
Bucoli
Laga
Macadai de Baixo
Quelicai
Venilale
Bobonaro District
Atabae
Balibo
Bobonaro
Lolotoe
Maliana
Cova Lima District
Fatululik
Fohoren
Suai 9,866
Tilomar
Zumalai
Dili District
Dare
Dili 222,323
Metinaro
Ermera District
Atsabe
Ermera 8,907
Gleno
 Hatolina
Lautém District
 Com
Fuiloro
Iliomar
 Laivai
Lautém
 Lore
Lospalos
Luro
 Mehara
Tutuala
Liquiçá District
Bazartete
Liquiçá 5,005
Maubara
Manatuto District
Laclubar
Laleia
Manatuto 3,692
 Natarbora
Manufahi District
Alas
Fatuberlio
Same
Turiscai
Oecusse District
Citrana
Nitibe
 Oe Silo
Pante Macassar 12,352
Passabe
Viqueque District
 Beacu
Lacluta
Ossu
 Uatolari
Viqueque 6,859
Atauro Island
 Berau
 Biquele

External links
Map

 
East Timor
East Timor
Cities